All Day Convenience Store is a convenience store division of All Value Holdings Inc., a subsidiary of MBV Group of Companies owned by a Filipino entrepreneur and a former Philippine senator, Manny Villar. All Day Convenience Store was the former Finds Convenience Store Inc., an experimental business of Villar which was established in 2008 with an initial 40 branches in Metro Manila.

History 
In 2008, then-senator Manny Villar ventured in the convenience store business and started Finds Convenience Store Inc. as his "experimental business". Finds grew to 40 branches along Metro Manila and served as a convenience store outlet for his housing business, Camella Homes and at his mall chain, StarMall.

Seeing the potential of Finds, Villar took serious and re-branded it as All Day Convenience Store in 2014.

In his interview to Entrepreneur Philippines, he said that Finds was one of his small and experimental companies, All Day is the serious attempt.

Taking up the challenge against his giant competitors like 7-Eleven and MiniStop, he expanded the branches of All Day to 80 along with the conversion of 40 existing branches of Finds Convenience Store Inc. to All Day Convenience Store.  He is optimistic to expand the All Day Convenience Store brand as a "True Filipino convenience store". At that time, new convenience store brands are coming into the Philippines when Puregold Price Club Inc. has tapped Lawson to open its branches in the Philippines, while SM unveils their venture with Indonesian convenience store, Alfamart and Ayala Land just introduced FamilyMart to the Philippines. The predominant convenience stores in the country, 7-Eleven which is managed by Victor Paterno and Ministop which is managed by John Gokongwei has just sprouted to Mindanao areas.

In All Day's recent expansion, it sprouted to more branches in Luzon, concentrating to condominiums, business towers and residential areas. The expansion then grew form being a convenience store to a minimart as "All Day Mart" with its debut at Starmall Prima Taguig (now Vista Mall Taguig) in May 2015. All Day also came to furniture retail business with the introduction of "All Home". It reached to 13 stores following the opening of All Home in Antipolo last July 2016. It soon grew as a supermarket, branded as All Day Supermart. The supermarket initially opened branches at Vista Mall Taguig, Starmall EDSA Shaw in Mandaluyong, and Vista Mall Santa Rosa in Santa Rosa, Laguna.

From the experiment on forming Finds Convenience Store Inc., it expanded to a huge "All Day" mega franchise, forming the parent company, All Value Holdings Inc.

However, despite the expansion of All Day brands, All Day Convenience Store reduces their number stores from 100 to 80+ as of 2016, but this is in result to the conversion of some All Day Convenience Store to All Day Mart and All Day Supermarket like their branches in Las Piñas and Vista Mall Taguig. However, Villar is still up for expansion of All Day Convenience Store with the growth and expansion to his land developments across the country.

Products and Services 
Like most convenience stores, All Day Convenience Stores do have its own products and services. Aside from selling snacks, magazines and groceries, All Day Convenience Store offers ATM and Billing Payments and Mobile Reloading.

And like its competitors that offers food to their customers, All Day Convenience Stores has also their own variety of food offerings:
 All Day Roast Chicken
 All Day Siomai
 All Day Siopao

Franchising 

Becoming aggressive to expand its franchise, All Day Convenience Store offers franchising services for those who are willing to operate their own All Day Convenience Store. The franchising can cost  with a term that lasts for six years with certain inclusions such as store management, operations and improvement.

See also 
 Manny Villar
 StarMall
 7-Eleven
 FamilyMart
 Ministop
 Alfamart

References

External links 
 Official site

Retail companies established in 2008
Convenience stores of the Philippines
Philippine brands
Companies based in Muntinlupa
2008 establishments in the Philippines